Shaykh Issa is a town in northern Aleppo Governorate, northwestern Syria. Located north of Aleppo, it is administratively part of Nahiya Tell Rifaat in A'zaz District. Nearby localities include Tell Rifaat to the west, Kaljibrin to the north and Mare' to the east. In the 2004 census, Shaykh Issa had a population of 4,296. The town is at 36.47926 ° N 37.14506 ° E

See also 
Sheikh Issa Elashury

References

Populated places in Aleppo Governorate